Stodolsky is a surname. Notable people with the surname include:

 Catherine Stodolsky (1938–2009), Jewish-American historian and teacher
 Leo Stodolsky, former director of the Max Planck Institute for Physics